Captain Sir John David Bingham Younger KCVO (born 20 May 1939) was Lord Lieutenant of Tweeddale from 1994 to 2014. He retired on reaching the age of seventy-five.

Educated at Eton and the Royal Military Academy Sandhurst, Younger was commissioned into the Argyll and Sutherland Highlanders in 1959, and served in Borneo and Singapore before joining the Directorate of Military Operations at the Ministry of Defence in 1967. He retired from the Army in 1969 and was with Scottish and Newcastle Breweries from 1969 to 1979 before becoming one of the founding partners of the Broughton Brewery in 1979. 

In 1969 he became a member of the Royal Company of Archers, which is the Queen's Bodyguard for Scotland, and was its Secretary from 1993 to 2007. He was Vice-President of the Royal Highland and Agricultural Society of Scotland in 1994, and became Vice-Lord Lieutenant of Tweeddale in 1992, before becoming Lord Lieutenant in 1994.

References

1939 births
Tweeddale
Members of the Royal Company of Archers
Graduates of the Royal Military Academy Sandhurst
 
Living people
People educated at Eton College